Toluca is a shower of iron meteorites found in Jiquipilco, Mexico near Toluca.

History
The meteorites probably crashed towards the Earth more than 10,000 years earlier.
For centuries, Mexican people living near the meteorites used them as a source of metal for various tools. They were seen by conquistadores about 1776.

The total known mass is about 3 tonnes.

Composition and classification
These iron meteorites are a coarse octahedrite, chemical type IAB-sLL.
The mean composition is 90.5% Fe and 8.1% Ni.
They often contain large troilite inclusions.

See also
 Glossary of meteoritics

References

Meteorites found in Mexico
Toluca
History of the State of Mexico
Natural history of the State of Mexico